Blooming Grove Township is a township in Pike County, Pennsylvania, United States. The population was 5,421 at the 2020 census.

History
The Lord House was added to the National Register of Historic Places in 1980.

On September 12, 2014, outside the Troop R barracks of the Pennsylvania State Police in the township, a sniper opened fire on Pennsylvania State Police troopers with a .308-caliber rifle during a late-night shift change, killing Corporal Bryon K. Dickson II, 38, and critically injuring trooper Alex Douglass. Eric Matthew Frein was identified as the sole suspect of the ambush and was sought by federal and state authorities for the ambush, until his apprehension at 6 p.m. on Thursday, October 30, ending a seven-week search.

Geography

Demographics

As of the census of 2010, there were 4,819 people, 1,834 households, and 1,348 families residing in the township. The population density was 64.4 people per square mile (24.9/km2). There were 3,971 housing units at an average density of 53.1/sq mi (20.7/km2). The racial makeup of the township was 91.8% White, 3.5% African American, 0.2% Native American, 1.1% Asian, 0.03% Pacific Islander, 1.7% from other races, and 1.8% from two or more races. Hispanic or Latino of any race were 5.4% of the population.

There were 1,834 households, out of which 24% had children under the age of 18 living with them, 61.1% were married couples living together, 7.4% had a female householder with no husband present, and 26.5% were non-families. 22.1% of all households were made up of individuals, and 12.1% had someone living alone who was 65 years of age or older. The average household size was 2.44 and the average family size was 2.85.

In the township the population was spread out, with 18.6% under the age of 18, 57.2% from 18 to 64, and 24.2% who were 65 years of age or older. The median age was 47.5 years.

The median income for a household in the township was $42,386, and the median income for a family was $46,250. Males had a median income of $31,941 versus $28,333 for females. The per capita income for the township was $20,920. About 6.4% of families and 8.6% of the population were below the poverty line, including 14.3% of those under age 18 and 4.6% of those age 65 or over.

References

External links
Official Township Website

Populated places established in 1810
Townships in Pike County, Pennsylvania
Towns in the New York metropolitan area